IGD may stand for:
 Internet Gateway Device Protocol as defined in UPnP
 İlerici Gençler Derneği, Progressive Young Association of Turkey
 Immunoglobulin D, an antibody protein involved in the maturation of B cells
 Integrated Graphics Device, a graphics processing unit integrated directly into the motherboard of a PC
 Islamic Community of Germany, a religious organization in Germany